Integration is the third studio album by American rapper Kellee Maize.  It was released on November 11, 2011 and was recorded primarily in her home studio, Nakturnal Studio. Musical styles present on the album include reggae, dubstep and electropop. The album's theme revolves around the idea of having a good balance between the opposites in human nature.

Release and reception
The album received generally positive reviews, reaching the top on both Amazon and Frostwire. It was also downloaded over 160,000 times within its first month of release. The first single from the album, "Hasta Abajo," peaked at number 7 on Jamendo. Maize performed multiple tracks from the LP at the album's release party in Pittsburgh at a local Middle-Eastern inspired performance venue.

Track listing

References

2011 albums
Kellee Maize albums